Fireball is a historically notable pinball machine designed by Ted Zale and released by Bally in 1972. The table was one of the first to have a modern sci-fi/fantasy type of outer space theme and featured elaborate, painted artwork on the sides of the table, painted by Dave Christensen.

Description
The game itself is notable as it featured several pinball innovations, including a spinning disc, moveable "zipper" flippers, and trapped ball bonuses. Fireball was also an early table to have the multi-ball (three balls, in this case) feature. Fireballs main surface and raised surface also featured elaborate artwork of a flaming "fire man", flames, and stars in space. The table is highly valued as a collector's item.

FireBall Professional Home model
Partly due to the success of the original Fireball pinball machine, Bally released a "Professional Home Model"  available to the regular consumer beginning in 1978. The layout was different from the arcade Fireball; it was a slight modification of the Bally's Hocus Pocus playfield with the subtraction of a ball diverter gate.

Fireball Classic
In February 1985, Bally released Fireball Classic.  While the field closely resembled the original this version was electronic and had no zipper-flippers.

Cultural references
Richard Linklater plays a rotoscoped Fireball in his 2001 film Waking Life, in the penultimate scene where he expounds Dickian gnosticism to the protagonist.

Also, Linkater's 1993 film Dazed and Confused features a scene that shows extreme close-ups of a game being played on a Fireball.

During the episode "Pinball" (Original air date: November 29, 1985) of the television series Mr. Belvedere, the title character becomes obsessed with a "Firebomb" pinball machine, a slightly altered Fireball.

Digital version
Fireball is a licensed table of The Pinball Arcade and comes with El Dorado (1975) as a single DLC.

References

External links

1972 pinball machines
1985 pinball machines
Bally pinball machines